Nathaniel Appleton Haven (July 19, 1762 – March 13, 1831) was an American politician, a physician, and served as a U.S. Representative from New Hampshire.

Early life
Haven was born in Portsmouth in the Province of New Hampshire. He attended Phillips Exeter Academy, where he graduated in 1807 with distinctions. He then pursued classical studies, was educated by the Reverend Dr. Nathaniel Appleton, and graduated in medicine from Harvard College in 1779.

Career
Haven practiced his profession in Portsmouth and also engaged in mercantile pursuits, and was editor of the Portsmouth Journal until 1825.

Serving as a ship's surgeon in the latter part of the Revolutionary War, Haven was captured by the British and was a prisoner of war aboard the Jersey prison ship at New York for a short time.

Elected as a Federalist to the Eleventh Congress, Haven served as United States Representative for the state of New Hampshire from (March 4, 1809 – March 3, 1811).

Death
Haven died in Portsmouth, on March 13, 1831, and is interred at Proprietors' Burying Ground. Died March 13, 1831 (age 68 years, 237 days). Interment at Proprietors' Burying Ground, Portsmouth, N.H.

Family life
Son to Samuel Haven and Mehitable Appleton, Haven married Mary Tufton Moffat, and they had three children, Maria Tufton Haven, Nathaniel Appleton Haven, and Charlotte Ann Haven.

References

External links

1762 births
1831 deaths
Harvard Medical School alumni
Continental Navy officers
Federalist Party members of the United States House of Representatives from New Hampshire
Phillips Exeter Academy alumni